The Mosque of Shaikh M. R. Bawa Muhaiyaddeen is located in Philadelphia, Pennsylvania on the grounds of the Bawa Muhaiyaddeen Fellowship. The building of the mosque took 6 months and was done by the members of the Bawa Muhaiyaddeen Fellowship under the direction of M. R. Bawa Muhaiyaddeen. It was completed by May 1984, two years before his death in 1986. The official opening and dedication took place on May 27, 1984.

The liturgical prayers follow the Hanafi tradition.

The mosque provides activities similar to other Islamic mosques including the five daily Islamic prayers (salat), Jum'ah prayers every Friday, and classes in Arabic, Qur'an recitation, Salat and Islam.  Unique to the mosque is the practice of early morning dhikr recitation (remembrance of God) using the practice instituted by Bawa Muhaiyaddeen.

Exterior Facade

The front exterior of the mosque consists of three exterior panels each covered with Arabic calligraphy written in gold-leaf lettering. The writings are verses from the Quran, the 99 names of God, and the names of 25 major prophets from the Islamic tradition.

Center Panel

At the peak of the arch above the Arabic Allah, is written the Bismillah - "In the name of God, the Most Gracious, the Most Merciful".
There is an Arabic Allah inscribed inside a large circle in the center, which is surrounded by the 99 names of God, the Asma'ul-Husna.
Above two doors, which are the men's entrance to the mosque, is Quranic verse 29, from Suratul Araf - The Heights.
On the two doors is written the name of God, Allah, and the names of 25 prophets: Muhammad, Jesus, John, Zacharia, Luqman, Jonah, Elisha, Shu'aib, Moses, Aaron, David, Solomon, Elijah, Job, Joseph, Jacob, Isaac, Ishmael, Lot, Adam, Idris, Noah, Hud, Salih, and Abraham.

Right Panel

At the peak of the arch above the Arabic Allah, is written the Bismillah - "In the name of God, the Most Gracious, the Most Merciful".
There is an Arabic Allah inscribed inside a large circle in the center.
Below the Arabic Allah are written Quranic verses 255 through 257  from Suratul Baaqara - the Heifer.

Left Panel

At the peak of the arch above the Arabic Allah, is written the Bismillah - "In the name of God, the Most Gracious, the Most Merciful".
There is an Arabic Allah inscribed inside a large circle in the center.  Below the Arabic Allah are written Quranic verses 35 through 38 from Suratun Nur - Light. Above the left panel is a frame with the words "Qadiriya Sufiya Tariqa" over "Shaikh M. R. Bawa Muhaiyaddeen".

Mosque Interior
The mosque has two entrances for men and women respectively, leading to  ablution rooms on the first floor. Stairways for each gender lead to the second floor prayer room, which can hold roughly 150 people.  Above the rear half of the prayer room is a dome situated over the women's section.

The Mihrab (Niche)

The niche at the front of the mosque indicates the direction for prayer. Surrounding the niche in a rectangular border are the Quranic verses 127 and 128 from Suratul Baqara - the Heifer. At the peak of the arch is written the Bismillah - "In the name of God, the Most Gracious, the Most Merciful".

The Border

Encircling the room, where the interior walls meet the ceiling, is a border with a width of about 10 inches.  Written upon the border are verses 1 through 26 of Suratul Kahf - The Cave.

The Dome

Encircling the base of the dome are sets of small windows set into the sides of an octagon. Each side holds 6 windows for a total of 48. The 99 names of Allah, the Asma'ul-Husna, are in the panes of the windows.
Below the windows is a border also completing a circle. On the border are written the following chapters of the Quran: Suratul Fatiha - The Opening, Suratul Iklas - Purity, Suratul Falaq - The Dawn, and Suratun Nas - Mankind.

Description of the Mosque by M. R. Bawa Muhaiyaddeen

"When I came a second time in 1973 [from Ceylon to the USA] as I was in meditation, I saw that I was building a mosque.  Like the mosque that I had started in Ceylon, it stopped when it was about 24 inches high. I was building a similar mosque here [in the USA].  The light of that mosque was so bright that it could give light all over America.  From that mosque you could hear the adhan [call to prayer] from this world to the hereafter.  I was building a mosque like that.

"There were angels, Rasuls [messengers], and myself building the mosque.  The only remaining job was the painting of the dome.  Everything else was completed.  Its beauty and its lights were indescribable.  It was effulgent everywhere.  It was a beautiful mosque.  Only the final painting of the dome was not finished.  Again I related this to the children [members] who were there.

"That is a mosque in the heaven called Firdaus.  That mosque was built here in America by me.  In America, it is possible to find people with a lot of iman [faith] who could reach that Firdaus.  There was only a little work to be completed on that mosque. After seeing this, I told the children [members] the mosque that I could not complete in Ceylon I have completed in the States.  Similarly such a mosque will be built here.  I saw this.  It is according to this that we have all come here.  This is Firdaus, that mosque."

"When you go to this Mosque outside and establish the right prayer, then you are really building a beautiful mosque within your heart, and that mosque is being built with God's qualities."

"The mosque that is here is not like the mosques that you see in the world.  This is a mosque which has been built in Allah's protection.  It is built out of His Daulat, His Wealth, and it is His Secret.  The construction was by the angels and the heavenly beings.  Their 'hands' have gone into the construction of this mosque.  God's Qudrat, His power, is in this mosque. You think this mosque was built only last year.  In fact, this mosque had been built long ago.  The only thing we have done is to paint it.  It is a mosque with extends to the seventh heaven above.  It extends from the very beginning to the very end.  It is a sufiyyat-marifat mosque.  The only thing that was done recently was to have the upper part covered."

"In the same way as the Ka'bah was built and protected with the birth of every prophet, in this country, too, in the same way as this country was before with Iman-Islam, may You [Allah] reinstate that state.  And even though this mosque is small , let it be filled with the prayers as at the Ka'bah.  To all those who belong there, to all those who come here, render their prayers as though it were at the Ka'bah.  To all those who pray at this ka'bah, give them benefit as though they had performed Hajj, the pilgrimage, to all those who pray.  Ya Rahman, please fulfill this prayer.  Wherever they pray the prayer is to Allah.  Wherever they turn, it is toward You, Ya Allah.  It is a prayer of plenitude.  May you make this grow all the time.  In every heart.  In the heart of every child.  Amin. Amin.  May You keep this lamp burning."

Notes

See also
  List of mosques in the Americas
  Lists of mosques 
  List of mosques in the United States

References

 Chapter 4: Third Wave Sufism in America and the Bawa Muhaiyaddeen Fellowship by Dr. Gisela Webb, Professor of Religious Studies at Seton Hall University

External links

Google video recording of the Opening of the Mosque of Shaikh M. R. Bawa Muhaiyaddeen on May 27, 1984
Building of the Mosque in Photos
https://picasaweb.google.com/100365101045530496759/THEBAWAMUHAIYADDEENFELLOWSHIPMOSQUEMAZAR

Mosques in Philadelphia
Sufi shrines
West Philadelphia
Mosques completed in 1984